Dwelling in Beulah Land is a hymn written and composed by C. Austin Miles who also wrote and composed "In the Garden". The song was published in 1911. It was used as the Fijian anthem.

References

External links
 

American Christian hymns
1911 songs
20th-century hymns